An arş (Ottoman Turkish آرش) is an old Turkish unit of length.

The word means 'forearm' and thus the measure corresponds to a cubit.

See also

 arşın, the Ottoman yard

Notes

Obsolete units of measurement
Units of length
Ottoman units of measurement